Gastón Ezequiel Corado (born 5 February 1989) is an Argentine footballer. He also holds Italian citizenship. He plays for Italian  club Pistoiese.

Club career
He made his Primera B Metropolitana debut for Temperley on 6 August 2013 in a game against Deportivo Merlo.

On 4 February 2019, he signed with Virtus Francavilla.

On 31 January 2020, he returned to Casertana.

On 23 September 2020 he joined Castrovillari.

References

References
 Profile at BDFA 
 
 

1989 births
Living people
Argentine footballers
Argentine expatriate footballers
Association football forwards
Footballers from Buenos Aires
A.D. Berazategui footballers
General Lamadrid footballers
Club Atlético Temperley footballers
Club Almagro players
Talleres de Remedios de Escalada footballers
Unión San Felipe footballers
Casertana F.C. players
Matera Calcio players
U.S. Catanzaro 1929 players
Virtus Francavilla Calcio players
U.S. Castrovillari Calcio players
Clodiense S.S.D. players
Taranto F.C. 1927 players
U.S. Pistoiese 1921 players
Primera B Metropolitana players
Primera B de Chile players
Serie C players
Serie D players
Argentine expatriate sportspeople in Chile
Argentine expatriate sportspeople in Italy
Expatriate footballers in Chile
Expatriate footballers in Italy